Malčište is a village in the municipality of Studeničani, North Macedonia.

Name
The name stems from the Albanian word for mountains, mal.

Demographics
According to the 1467-68 Ottoman defter, Malčište appears as being inhabited by an Orthodox Christian population. Some families had a mixed Slavic-Albanian anthroponomy. The names are:Niko son of Dom-ina, Radoslav son of Dom-ina, Hranislav son of Dona, Bojko son of Dona, Gropça son of Goja, Radislav son of Dominiko, Spana (Stana) widow.  

In statistics gathered by Vasil Kanchov in 1900, the village of Malčište was inhabited by 90 Muslim Albanians. The Yugoslav census of 1953 recorded 194 people of whom 135 were Albanians, 52 Turks and 7 Macedonians. The 1961 Yugoslav census recorded 159 people of whom were 158 Turks and 1 Albanian. The 1971 census recorded 51 people of whom were Turks. The 1981 Yugoslav census recorded 69 people of whom were 47 Turks, 17 Albanians, 1 Macedonian and 4 others. The Macedonian census of 1994 recorded 7 Turks.

According to the 2021 census, the village had a total of 38 inhabitants. Ethnic groups in the village include:

Albanians 12
Others 26

References

Villages in Studeničani Municipality
Turkish communities in North Macedonia
Albanian communities in North Macedonia